West Perrine is a census-designated place (CDP) in Miami-Dade County, Florida,  United States. Prior to the 2000 census it was part of Perrine. The other part of Perrine became the East Perrine CDP for the 2000 census and is now part of the incorporated Village of Palmetto Bay. West Perrine is still an unincorporated area, although some residents have discussed the possibility of incorporating Perrine. The population was 10,602 at the 2020 census, up from 9,460 in 2010. The name derives from a land grant issued to the heirs of Henry Perrine, an agriculturist (among other things).

Geography
It is bordered to the north by Palmetto Estates, to the east by Palmetto Bay, to the southeast by Cutler Bay, to the south by South Miami Heights, and to the west by Zoo Miami.

U.S. Route 1 (Dixie Highway) forms the eastern border of the community. It leads northeast into Miami and southwest  to Homestead.

Demographics

2020 census

As of the 2020 United States census, there were 10,602 people, 2,890 households, and 2,199 families residing in the CDP.

2000 census
As of the census of 2000, there were 8,600 people, 2,642 households, and 2,021 families residing in the CDP. The racial makeup of the CDP was 18.92% White (8.6% were Non-Hispanic White,) 73.41% African American, 0.28% Native American, 1.20% Asian, 0.07% Pacific Islander, 3.16% from other races, and 2.97% from two or more races. Hispanic or Latino of any race were 16.29% of the population.

There were 2,642 households, out of which 39.6% had children under the age of 18 living with them, 36.6% were married couples living together, 31.9% had a female householder with no husband present, and 23.5% were non-families. 19.4% of all households were made up of individuals, and 8.7% had someone living alone who was 65 years of age or older.  The average household size was 3.25 and the average family size was 3.71.

In the CDP, the population was spread out, with 33.9% under the age of 18, 9.6% from 18 to 24, 27.4% from 25 to 44, 18.9% from 45 to 64, and 10.2% who were 65 years of age or older.  The median age was 30 years. For every 100 females, there were 87.9 males.  For every 100 females age 18 and over, there were 81.8 males.

The median income for a household in the CDP was $28,420, and the median income for a family was $29,987. Males had a median income of $27,383 versus $22,944 for females. The per capita income for the CDP was $12,190.  About 30.8% of families and 34.4% of the population were below the poverty line, including 52.1% of those under age 18 and 25.0% of those age 65 or over.

As of 2000, speakers of English as a first language accounted for 79.75% of residents, while Spanish made up 17.78%, and French Creole was the mother tongue of 2.46% of the population.

References

External links
 

Census-designated places in Miami-Dade County, Florida
Census-designated places in Florida